Hat Peak may refer to:

Places
Hat Peak (Elko County, Nevada)
Hat Peak (Nye County, Nevada)

Other
The horizontal surface on any hat or helmet that shades the eyes (British English, known as a visor in US English). See Peaked cap.